is a Japanese former actress. During her career from 2003 until 2017, she starred in numerous Japanese television dramas, television and magazine advertisements, and movies, including roles in Nobuta wo Produce, Hanazakari no Kimitachi e and Umechan Sensei.

Early life
Horikita was born on October 6, 1988, in Kiyose, Tokyo, Japan. She is the eldest of three daughters. Considered a tomboy in her childhood, Horikita enjoyed playing basketball and baseball. She was the vice-captain of their basketball club in junior high. Despite her boyishness, Horikita looked up to her mother. This was revealed when she appeared in an episode of KAT-TUN's now-defunct variety show Cartoon KAT-TUN where she mentioned that she liked imitating her mother when she was younger.

Career

Print & TV endorsement
Apart from modeling for photobooks, Horikita has appeared in magazines and television advertisements.  She is best remembered for her television commercials for Fujifilm (where she appeared alongside Japanese idol Tomoya Nagase) and Lotte. She is also a staple image endorser for Suntory and NTT DoCoMo. In 2008, Nihon Monitor recognized Horikita as one of Japan's top endorsers during its annual Most Popular Personality in TV CMs.

Acting
Horikita had been cast in several drama series and movies since 2003 but her roles in Densha Otoko and Nobuta wo Produce became her breakthrough performances. Her promising portrayal of the titular character in Nobuta wo Produce won her a Best Supporting Actress award from Japan's Television Academy Awards. It was also around this time that she won the Newcomer Award from Japan Academy Awards for her role as a student apprentice in Always: Sunset on Third Street.

In the following year, she won her second Best Supporting Actress award for her role in Kurosagi.  Months later, she was given the lead role for Teppan Shoujo Akane!! and the role of a bully who is behind a class rebellion in Seito Shokun! where she co-starred with her agency senior Rina Uchiyama. She was also cast in the horror movie, One Missed Call: Final, the last installment of the One Missed Call franchise with agency colleague and best friend Meisa Kuroki and South Korean actor Jang Keun-suk.

Soon after, Horikita was awarded her first Best Actress award for her role as Mizuki Ashiya in the Japanese drama adaptation of the gender-bender manga Hana-Kimi, or Hanazakari no Kimitachi e.  In the same year that Hana Kimi was filmed, Horikita also starred in the Taiga drama Atsuhime with Aoi Miyazaki. In the same year, she played the lead character who has multiple personality disorder in the suspense movie Tokyo Shōnen and reprised her role as a student apprentice in Always: Zoku Sanchome no Yuhi, the sequel to her breakthrough movie. Horikita's exceptional work was recognized by Vogue Nippon which identified her as one of the eleven Women of the Year in 2007.

On October of the following year, she was once again seen on television opposite Yuzu's lead vocalist Yujin Kitagawa, leading the cast of Fuji TV's golden time slot in the drama Innocent Love. Towards the end of the year, she had been cast as Naomi, the female protagonist of Dareka ga Watashi ni Kiss wo Shite  or DareKiss (based on Gabrielle Zevin's popular novel, Memoirs of a Teenage Amnesiac) a Hollywood-Japan collaboration film directed by internationally acclaimed director and self-confessed Japanese culture fanatic Hans Canosa.  It was revealed that one-third of her lines in the movie were in English.

As soon as the filming for DareKiss ended, Horikita had gone on to appear in two television dramas: Atashinchi no Danshi in 2009 as an adoptive mother of six young men (played by Jun Kaname and Mukai Osamu among others) and Tokujo Kabachi!! in 2010 as an administrative scrivener opposite Arashi's Sho Sakurai.

In January 2011, Horikita starred in the movie adaptation of Into the White Night, a widely read novel that was adapted into a television drama in 2006 starring Haruka Ayase and Takayuki Yamada. Produced by WOWOW FILMS, the movie was screened at the Berlin Film Festival in the Panorama category.

In 2012, Horikita was offered to lead the cast of an NHK asadora named Umechan Sensei . The morning drama featured Horikita as Umeko Shimomura in her carefree teenage years until she blossomed into a dependable town doctor during the Showa era.  For the first time in nine years, NHK recorded an average audience rating past 20% for an asadora time slot when Umechan Sensei garnered an average audience rating of 20.7%. At the end of 2012, Horikita made her stage debut in a performance of Joan of Arc.

After the success of her asadora, Horikita has continued accepting lead roles in more television and movie projects like in the evening dramas Miss Pilot in 2013 and Masshiro in 2015 as well as in the film Mugiko-san to in 2013.

Radio and voice acting
Horikita was one of the six female celebrities taking turns to host Girls Locks!, a segment of the Japanese radio program School of Locks from the radio network Tokyo FM. When she was the host, Horikita provided book recommendations to her listeners and called selected letter-senders to discuss the questions they wrote in their letters. Her stint was at ten in the evening, every third or fourth week of the month. She took turns with Erika Toda, Yui Aragaki, Chiaki Kuriyama, Nana Eikura, and Kii Kitano until she left the program in 2009.

Horikita had also ventured into voice acting, debuting as an anime voice actress for one of the characters in Nobita and the Green Giant Legend 2008. Her highly featured project as a voice actress was for Professor Layton in which she provided the voice of the main character Luke.

In early 2009, she also dubbed a character from the Belgian 3D animated movie Nat's Space Adventure 3D/Fly Me to the Moon. She dubbed the voice of the protagonist who is a young male fly who was determined to explore outer space.

Personal life
On 22 August 2015 Horikita's management agency announced that she had married actor Koji Yamamoto earlier that day. The couple became close in May 2015 when playing the role of lovers in the theatrical production Arashi ga Oka (Wuthering Heights) and had commenced dating in June. On June 20, 2016, she announced her pregnancy. She gave birth to her first child in December 2016. On February 28, 2017, she announced her retirement from the entertainment industry.

Filmography

TV dramas

Films

Video games 
 Professor Layton series (Japanese) - Luke Triton
 Professor Layton vs. Ace Attorney - Luke Triton

Dubbing 
Fantastic Four, Sue Storm / Invisible Woman (Kate Mara)

Accolades

References

External links 

Maki Horikita at Nippon Cinema

1988 births
Living people
People from Kiyose, Tokyo
Actresses from Tokyo
Voice actresses from Tokyo Metropolis
Japanese film actresses
Japanese stage actresses
Japanese television actresses
Japanese video game actresses
Japanese voice actresses
Asadora lead actors
21st-century Japanese actresses